This is a list of United Nations Security Council Resolutions 1601 to 1700 adopted between 31 May 2005 and 10 August 2006.

See also 
 Lists of United Nations Security Council resolutions
 List of United Nations Security Council Resolutions 1501 to 1600
 List of United Nations Security Council Resolutions 1701 to 1800

1601